Chemist may refer to:

In all countries:

 Chemist, a scientist trained in the science of chemistry

In Australia, Hong Kong, Ireland, New Zealand, the United Kingdom, Malaysia, Singapore and some other countries:

 a pharmacist (dispensing chemist)

See also
 List of chemists
 The Chemist (disambiguation)
 The Qemists, a British Drum & Bass band